The jurors of the Eurovision Song Contest 2015 are involved in the voting process. For the semi finals and the final, each country's votes was decided by a combination of 50% televoting by the public and 50% by national jury.

Background
In response to some broadcasters' continued complaints about politically charged, neighbourly and diaspora voting, the European Broadcasting Union (EBU) evaluated the voting procedure used in the contest, and contemplated a change for 2009.  Contest organisers sent a questionnaire regarding the voting system to participating broadcasters, and a reference group incorporated the responses into their suggestions for next year's format. Telewizja Polska (TVP), the Polish broadcaster, suggested that an international jury similar to the one used in the 2008 Eurovision Dance Contest be introduced in the Eurovision Song Contest to lessen the impact of neighbourly voting and place more emphasis on the artistic value of the song. A jury would lead to less political and diaspora voting as the jury members, mandated to be music industry experts, would also have a say in addition to "random members of the public". National juries were originally phased out of the contest beginning in 1997, with televoting becoming mandatory for nearly all participants since 2003.

Format
The competition will consist of two semi-finals and a final, a format which has been in use since 2008. The ten countries with the highest scores in each semi-final will qualify to the final where they will join the host nation Austria, the five main sponsoring nations (known as the Big Five): France, Germany, Italy, Spain and the United Kingdom, and Australia which was invited this year to commemorate the Contest's 60th anniversary.

Each participating country had their own national jury, which consisted of five professional members of the music industry.
Each member of a respective nation's jury was required to rank every song, except that of their own country. The voting results from each member of a particular nation's jury were combined to produce an overall ranking from first to last place. Likewise, the televoting results were also interpreted as a full ranking, taking into account the full televoting result rather than just the top ten. The combination of the jury's full ranking and the televote's full ranking produced an overall ranking of all competing entries. The song which scored the highest overall rank received 12 points, while the tenth-best ranked song received 1-point.   In the event of a televoting(insufficient number of votes/technical issues) or jury failure(technical issue/breach of rules), only a jury/televoting was used by each country

Jurors
The jurors of the 40 participating countries were as follows:

See also
Eurovision Song Contest 2015
Voting at the Eurovision Song Contest

References

Jurors
Jurors